The Sea Islands are a chain of tidal and barrier islands on the Atlantic Ocean coast of the Southeastern United States. Numbering over 100, they are located between the mouths of the Santee and St. Johns Rivers along the coast of South Carolina, Georgia, and Florida. The largest of these is Johns Island in South Carolina. The Sea Islands, particularly Sapelo Island, are home to the Gullah people. The islands are very acutely threatened by sea level rise due to Climate Change.

History
Settled by indigenous cultures over thousands of years, the islands were selected by Spanish colonists as sites for founding of colonial missions.  Historically the Spanish influenced the Guale and Mocama chiefdoms by establishing Christian missions in their major settlements, from St. Catherine's Island south to Fort George Island (at present-day Jacksonville, Florida). The area was home to multiple plantations; in 1863 Fanny Kemble published Journal of a Residence on a Georgian Plantation in 1838–1839 about her experience on her husband's plantations in St. Simon's Island and Butler Island.

After President Abraham Lincoln's Emancipation Proclamation became effective on January 1, 1863, more than 5,000 slaves on Union-occupied islands obtained their freedom.

Major Sea Islands

South Carolina

Charleston County

 Bull Island
 Dewees Island
 Edisto Island (also in Colleton County)
 Folly Island
 Isle of Palms
 James Island
 Johns Island
 Kiawah Island
 Morris Island
 Seabrook Island
 Sullivan's Island
 Wadmalaw Island
 Yonges Island

Colleton County
 Bear Island

Beaufort County

 Bay Point Island
 Cane Island
 Cat Island
 Coosaw Island
 Dataw Island
 Daufuskie Island
 Distant Island
 Fripp Island
 Gibbes Island
 Harbor Island
 Hilton Head Island
 Horse Island
 Hunting Island
 Lady's Island
 Morgan Island
 Parris Island
 Port Royal Island
 Pritchards Island
 St. Helena Island
 St. Phillips Island
 Spring Island

Georgia

Chatham County

Tybee Island
Little Tybee Island
Cockspur Island
Wilmington Island
Talahi Island
Whitemarsh Island
Oatland Island
Skidaway Island
Isle of Hope
Williamson Island
Dutch Island
Burnside Island
Wassaw Island
Ossabaw Island

Liberty County

St. Catherine's Island
Isle of Wight
Hampton Island

McIntosh County

Blackbeard Island
Sapelo Island

Glynn County 

Jekyll Island
Little St. Simons Island
St. Simons Island
Sea Island

Camden County

Cumberland Island

Florida

Nassau County 

Amelia Island

Duval County 

Big Talbot Island
Little Talbot Island

St. Johns County 
Anastasia Island

See also
 Sea Island cotton
 Carolina Gold rice
 Sea Island red peas

References

Further reading

External links
Sea Islands: Erosion Remnant Islands and Barrier Islands -- Beaufort County Library

 
Barrier islands of the United States
East Coast islands of the United States
Islands of Florida
Islands of Georgia (U.S. state)
Islands of South Carolina
Southeastern United States
South Carolina in the American Civil War
Lists of islands of the United States